Fergal Bradshaw is a former Gaelic footballer and an Australian rules footballer. He played at minor level for the Dublin county team.

Playing career
The  Trinity Gaels GAA clubman represented the Dublin county team at minor level in 1996. He played  Australian Football with the Dublin Demons and played on the Half-back line for the Ireland national Australian rules football team, that won the 2002 Australian Football International Cup and the 2001 Atlantic Alliance Cup.

References

Living people
Year of birth missing (living people)
Dublin Gaelic footballers 
Trinity Gaels Gaelic footballers
Gaelic footballers who switched code
Irish players of Australian rules football
Irish expatriate sportspeople in Australia
Sportspeople from Dublin (city)